The year 1805 in architecture involved some significant events.

Buildings and structures

Buildings

 November 26 – The Ellesmere Canal's Pontcysyllte Aqueduct, designed by Thomas Telford and William Jessop, is opened on the border of Wales, the tallest and longest in Britain.
 Theatre Royal, Bath, England is opened.
 Evangelical Lutheran Church of Saint Mary in Saint Petersburg is built.
 Haga Palace in Stockholm, Sweden, designed by Carl Christoffer Gjörwell, is completed.

Awards
 Grand Prix de Rome, architecture: Auguste Guenepin

Births
 March 11 – Thomas Ellis Owen, English architect working chiefly around Southsea (d. 1862)
 June 9 – Victor Baltard, French architect (d. 1874)
 July 26 – John Miller, Scottish railway civil engineer (d. 1883)
 Peter Ellis, English architect working in Liverpool (d. 1884)
 James Salmon, Scottish architect (d. 1888)

Deaths
 Peter Atkinson, English architect (b. 1725)

References

Architecture
Years in architecture
19th-century architecture